The 2013–14 Florida Gulf Coast Eagles men's basketball team represented Florida Gulf Coast University (FGCU) in the 2013–14 NCAA Division I men's basketball season. FGCU was a member of the Atlantic Sun Conference and were the defending A-Sun Tournament champion. They played their home games at Alico Arena.

The team went through many changes for the 2013–14 season. Head coach Andy Enfield left to take the same job at USC and former Kansas assistant Joe Dooley takes over as head coach. Atlantic Sun Conference Men's Basketball Player of the Year Sherwood Brown graduated and turned professional, signing a contract with Israel's Maccabi Haifa B.C. in July 2013.

They finished the season 22–13, 14–4 in Atlantic Sun play to finish in a tie for the regular season conference championship with Mercer. At the Atlantic Sun Conference tournament they advanced to their third consecutive championship game where they lost to Mercer. Due to failing to win the conference tournament as the #1 seed, they earned an automatic bid to the 2014 National Invitation Tournament where they lost in the first round to Florida State.

Pre-season

Coaching changes

Player changes

Roster

Schedule 

|-
!colspan=9 style=| Non-conference regular season

|-
!colspan=9 style=| Atlantic Sun regular season

|-
!colspan=12 style=| Atlantic Sun tournament

|-
!colspan=12 style=| NIT

References

Florida Gulf Coast Eagles men's basketball seasons
Florida Gulf Coast
Florida Gulf Coast